Jules Gimbert (born 2 March 1998) is a French rugby union player. His position is scrum-half and he currently plays for Bordeaux Bègles in the Top 14.

Personal life
Gimbert's father is French rugbyman Philippe Gimbert.

International honours

France (U20)
Six Nations Under 20s Championship winners: 2018
World Rugby Under 20 Championship winners: 2018

References

External links
UBB profile
L'Équipe profile

1998 births
Living people
French rugby union players
Union Bordeaux Bègles players
Rugby union scrum-halves
Sportspeople from Gironde